Meliosma is a genus of flowering plants in the family Sabiaceae, native to tropical to warm temperate regions of southern and eastern Asia and the Americas. It is traditionally considered to contain about 100 species; some botanists take a much more conservative view accepting only 20-25 species as distinct. They are trees or shrubs, growing to 10–45 m tall.

Fossil evidence shows the genus formerly had a much wider range in the Northern Hemisphere, including Europe and central Asia until the late Pliocene ice ages, and somewhat earlier in North America. Meliosma symbolises Peruvian cloud forest plants which, once did not have even a single species of Sabiaceae. Now,at least 17 species of Meliosma are known from Peru. 

The Indian awlking (Choaspes benjaminii) is one of the Lepidoptera whose caterpillars feed on Meliosma; they have been found on M. pungens, rhoifolia, M. rigida, and M. squamulata.

Selected species
Asia

 Meliosma angustifolia
 Meliosma arnottiana (syn. Wellingtonia arnottiana)
 Meliosma beaniana
 Meliosma bifida
 Meliosma callicarpaefolia
 Meliosma cuneifolia
 Meliosma dentata
 Meliosma dilleniifolia
 Meliosma dumicola
 Meliosma flexuosa
 Meliosma fordii
 Meliosma glandulosa
 Meliosma henryi
 Meliosma kirkii
 Meliosma laui
 Meliosma longipes
 Meliosma myriantha
 Meliosma oldhamii
 Meliosma parviflora
 Meliosma paupera
 Meliosma pinnata
 Meliosma pungens
 Meliosma rhoifolia
 Meliosma rigida
 Meliosma simplicifolia
 Meliosma squamulata
 Meliosma sumatrana
 Meliosma thomsonii
 Meliosma thorelii
 Meliosma veitchiorum
 Meliosma velutina
 Meliosma yunnanensis

Americas

 Meliosma alba
 †Meliosma beusekomii
 Meliosma bogotana
 Meliosma brasiliensis Urb.
 Meliosma cordata
 Meliosma frondosa
 Meliosma glaziovii
 Meliosma herbertii
 Meliosma itatiaiae
 Meliosma linearifolia
 Meliosma littlei
 Meliosma meridensis
 Meliosma nesites
 Meliosma sellowii
 Meliosma sinuata
 Meliosma sirensis
 Meliosma vernicosa
 Meliosma youngii

Fossil record
Fossil endocarps from the early Miocene of  Meliosma wetteraviensis, have been found in the Czech part of the Zittau Basin. Stratigraphical range of this taxon is from the late Oligocene to Pliocene of Western Europe and Siberia.

Footnotes

References
  (1971): Revision of Meliosma (Sabiaceae), section Lorenzanea excepted, living and fossil, geography and phylogeny. Blumea 19: 355–529.

External links
Flora of Pakistan: Meliosma
Flora of China: Meliosma species list
Flora of Ecuador: Meliosma
IAC Herbarium (Brazil): Meliosma species list

 
Eudicot genera